Pippi Longstocking is an animated television series produced by AB Svensk Filmindustri, TaurusFilm, TFC Trickompany Filmproduktion, and Nelvana based on the book series drawn and written by Swedish author Astrid Lindgren. It is a joint Canadian-German-Swedish production. This was the first time that the popular character had been animated. A spin-off of the 1997 animated film of the same name, the series disregards the film and starts with a new storyline. Melissa Altro, Richard Binsley, Noah Reid, Olivia Garratt, Wayne Robson, Rick Jones, Philip Williams, Chris Wiggins and Karen Bernstein are the only voice cast reprising their roles from the 1997 film. It was led by German director Michael Schaack. The story editor and chief writer for the series was Ken Sobol whose son, John, also wrote several episodes.

Cast
Melissa Altro as Pippi Longstocking
Richard Binsley as Mr. Nilsson
Noah Reid as Tommy Settergren
Olivia Garratt as Annika Settergren
Len Carlson as Thunder-Karlsson
Wayne Robson as Bloom
Rick Jones as Constable Kling
Philip Williams as Constable Klang
Ben Campbell as Captain Ephraim Longstocking
Chris Wiggins as Fridolf
Jill Frappier as Mrs. Prysselius
Karen Bernstein as Mrs. Ingrid Settergren
Ray Landry as Mr. Settergren

Broadcast
The show aired on Teletoon in Canada starting October 17, 1997, the day the channel launched. It was also shown on HBO in the United States, Nickelodeon Latin America and Brazil, Nickelodeon, Channel 4, Pop and Pop Girl in the United Kingdom, Australian Broadcasting Corporation in Australia), Boing in Italy, Cartoon Network in Asia, Arutz HaYeladim in Israel, Cartoon Network and TV Tokyo in Japan, and ZDF and Disney Channel in Germany. It later ran on YTV in Canada, Qubo in the United States, TF1 and France 5 in France, Boomerang in Japan and Disney Junior and KiKa in Germany.

Episodes
The series aired for two seasons, with 26 half-hour episodes being made in total.

Season 1 (1997-1998)

Season 2 (1998)

References

External links
 

1997 Canadian television series debuts
1998 Canadian television series endings
1990s Canadian animated television series
Canadian television shows based on children's books
Canadian children's animated comedy television series
Television series by Nelvana
Pippi Longstocking
English-language television shows
Teletoon original programming
Animated television series about orphans
Animated television shows based on films
Television shows based on works by Astrid Lindgren